van Thielen or Vanthielen is a surname. Notable people with the surname include:

Francesca Vanthielen (born 1972), Belgian actress, television presenter and economist
Jan Philip van Thielen (1618–1667), Flemish Baroque painter
Maria Theresa van Thielen (1640–1706), Flemish Baroque painter, daughter of Jan

Surnames of Dutch origin